Byron Hodge (born 29 March 1992) is a Professional Rugby Union Player currently playing for London Scottish in the Greene King IPA Championship. Previously he has played for the Saracens in the Aviva A League as well as the Rotherham Titans and the Bedford Blues in the Greene King IPA Championship. In 2014 Byron Hodge played for the Sydney Stars in the National Rugby Championship.

References 

Australian rugby union players
1992 births
Living people
Richmond F.C. players
Rugby union locks
Rugby union players from Sydney